Nothing But a Man is an American 1970 novelization by Jim Thompson based on the film Nothing But a Man (1964).

Plot
Duff Anderson moves to a small town to work on the railroad. He marries Josie, much to the dislike of her preacher father, and they both re-locate to live in their own house and Duff lands a job in a mill and tries to unionize the workers.

References

Novels by Jim Thompson
1970 American novels
English-language novels
Novels based on films